The 2013–14 season was the 54th season in the history of NK Maribor and the club's 23rd consecutive season in the Slovenian PrvaLiga since the league establishment in 1991. The team participated in the Slovenian PrvaLiga, Slovenian Football Cup, UEFA Champions League, and UEFA Europa League. The season covers the period from 1 June 2013 to 31 May 2014.

After they won the Slovenian version of the treble (League, Cup and Supercup) during the previous season, Maribor came close to repeating its achievement during the 2013–14 season, however, they were denied this honour on 21 May 2014 when they were defeated by Gorica in the Slovenian Cup Final. However, the club was not without success as they have managed to win the Slovenian Supercup for the third time in their history and were crowned PrvaLiga champions for the 12th time. The Supercup title was won under the leadership of Croatian manager Ante Čačić, who was replaced by former player Ante Šimundža early in the season. In UEFA competitions Maribor qualified for the UEFA Europa League group stage for the third successive season and, after winning seven points in a group with Rubin Kazan, Zulte Waregem and Wigan Athletic, they qualified to the UEFA Europa League knockout phase for the first time, becoming the first Slovenian club to play European football in the second part of the season. In the Round of 32 Maribor faced Sevilla and were defeated with the score 4–3 on aggregate. The Spanish side went out to win the competition couple of months later.

Bosnian striker Nusmir Fajić was the club's top scorer during the season with 19 goals, 16 of which were scored in the Slovenian PrvaLiga. Club captain Marcos Tavares made history in the second part of the season when he tied Branko Horjak's all-time goalscoring record (117) and eventually surpassing it. He has also surpassed a joint record previously held by Ante Šimundža and Kliton Bozgo who both scored 78 league goals for the club. During the course of the 2013–14 season Maribor maintained an average league attendance of 3,089 on its home matches. In addition, Maribor were the only PrvaLiga team that had an average league attendance of over 1,000 spectators.

Season overview
Before the start of the 2013–14 season, Croatian manager Ante Čačić replaced Darko Milanič as the head coach at the club. Milanič, who has decided to accept an offer from Austrian Sturm Graz, has won a total of nine domestic trophies with Maribor, between 2008 and 2013, more than any other coach in the club's history. Weeks after the departure of Milanič, Sturm acquired Maribor's forward Robert Berić in a transfer reportedly worth one million euros.

The 2012–13 season was one of the most successful seasons in history of the club as Maribor won the domestic version of the treble, having won the league, cup and supercup titles. In addition, Maribor has qualified to the UEFA Europa League for the second successive year, where they have won four points in a group with Lazio, Panathinaikos and Tottenham.

The start of the 2013–14 season saw Maribor competing in their fifth successive Slovenian Supercup, which was played against the Slovenian PrvaLiga runners-up Olimpija. Although the previous Supercup editions were traditionally played at the venue of the league champions, this was not the case for the 2013 Slovenian Supercup edition, as the Football Association of Slovenia decided for a neutral venue in Celje. Nevertheless, Maribor prevailed and won the final 3–0, securing their third Slovenian Supercup title.

Under Čačić's leadership, the club did particularly well in the Slovenian PrvaLiga, maintaining a perfect score during the first six league rounds. During the 2013–14 UEFA Champions League qualifiers the team did not fare so well, managing only one win in six matches, however, Maribor did qualify for the group stage of the 2013–14 UEFA Europa League for the third successive season after they have eliminated Cypriot club APOEL (1–1 on aggregate). On 19 September 2013, the team played their first match in the group stage of the UEFA Europa League and was defeated by the Russian side Rubin Kazan. This was followed by the first league defeat against Zavrč three days later. In the following week, Maribor played at home against Rudar Velenje and away against Koper and managed to get only a point against the side from Velenje. A day after their 2–1 defeat in Koper, the club announced the termination of Čačić's contract. He was replaced by Ante Šimundža, who was an assistant manager at Maribor between 2008 and 2011 and has spent a total of 10 seasons at the club as a player in the 1990s.

With Šimundža at the helm the club continued with poor form in the top division, suffering two defeats in the first four matches with the new coach, however, they eventually won five out of eight matches, which ensured them a top place finish after the first part of the season, maintaining a two-point lead ahead of Koper. The club also managed to qualify into the semi-final of the Slovenian Cup after they have knocked out two second division teams, Radomlje and Šenčur. Maribor's biggest success, however, came in the UEFA Europa League where they have won seven points in the remaining five matches and finished on second place in their group, qualifying to the UEFA Europa League knockout phase for the first time in the club's history, becoming the first Slovenian club to play European football in the second part of the season. In the Round of 32 they played in a two-legged tie against the Spanish side Sevilla and lost by an aggregate score of 4–3.

However, the UEFA Europa League elimination did not affect the team in domestic competition as Maribor managed to win 12 out of 17 league matches in the second part of the season, losing only two in the process. The club eventually won their 12th league title, with eight point lead ahead of Koper. Things were looking bright for the team in the Slovenian Cup as well, when Maribor defeated Olimpija in the semi-final and reached the final for the fifth successive season. In the Cup final, which was played at a neutral venue in Koper, Maribor faced Gorica and were defeated with the score 2–0. The season was marked by Marcos Tavares who set two goalscoring records. He has become the club's all-time leading goalscorer when he passed Branko Horjak's 117 goals in official competitions. In addition, he has also passed a joint record previously held by Ante Šimundža and Kliton Bozgo (78) for the most goals scored for the club in the Slovenian PrvaLiga. The final match of the season was played on 25 May 2014 against Domžale and was marked by the farewell of Dejan Mezga who has spent eight seasons with the club and whose contract was due to expire at the end of the season.

Supercup

Colour key: Green = Maribor win; Yellow = draw; Red = opponents win.

Slovenian League

Standings

Results summary

Results by round

Matches

Colour key: Green = Maribor win; Yellow = draw; Red = opponents win.

Notes

Slovenian Cup

Colour key: Green = Maribor win; Yellow = draw; Red = opponents win.

Notes

European campaign

UEFA Champions League

Second qualifying round 

Colour key: Green = Maribor win; Yellow = draw; Red = opponents win.

Third qualifying round 

Colour key: Green = Maribor win; Yellow = draw; Red = opponents win.

Play-off round 

Colour key: Green = Maribor win; Yellow = draw; Red = opponents win.

UEFA Europa League

Group D

Colour key: Green = Maribor win; Yellow = draw; Red = opponents win.

Notes

Round of 32

Colour key: Green = Maribor win; Yellow = draw; Red = opponents win.

Friendlies

Colour key: Green = Maribor win; Yellow = draw; Red = opponents win.

Squad statistics

Key

Players
No.     = Shirt number
Pos.    = Playing position
GK      = Goalkeeper
DF      = Defender
MF      = Midfielder
FW      = Forward

Nationality
 = Bosnia and Herzegovina
 = Brazil
 = Croatia
 = France
 = Macedonia
 = Serbia
 = Slovenia
 = Uruguay

Competitions
Apps    = Appearances
 = Yellow card
 = Red card

Foreign players
Below is the list of foreign players who have made appearances for the club during the 2013–14 season. Players primary citizenship is listed first.

EU Nationals
  Dejan Mezga
 Jean-Philippe Mendy

EU Nationals (Dual citizenship)
  Arghus
  Marcos Tavares
  Pablo Ceppelini

Non-EU Nationals
 Nusmir Fajić
 Agim Ibraimi
 Ranko Moravac

Appearances and goals
Correct as of 25 May 2014, end of the 2013–14 season. Flags indicate national team as has been defined under FIFA eligibility rules. Players may hold more than one non-FIFA nationality. The players squad numbers, playing positions, nationalities and statistics are based solely on match reports in Matches sections above and the official website of NK Maribor and the Slovenian PrvaLiga. Only the players, which made at least one appearance for the first team, are listed.

Discipline
Correct as of 25 May 2014, end of the 2013–14 season. Flags indicate national team as has been defined under FIFA eligibility rules. Players may hold more than one non-FIFA nationality. The players squad numbers, playing positions, nationalities and statistics are based solely on match reports in Matches sections above and the official website of NK Maribor and the Slovenian PrvaLiga. If a player received two yellow cards in a match and was subsequently sent off the numbers count as two yellow cards, one red card.

Transfers and loans

Manegerial changes

Summer transfer window

Winter transfer window

Footnotes
After signing with Maribor, Dare Vršič selected the number 22 for his jersey, which was the number previously worn by Nejc Potokar who left the club during the winter break. However, because Potokar was registered for the UEFA competitions in the first part of the season, Vršič was unable to wear the number and was registered with the number two in the knockout phase of the 2013–14 UEFA Europa League.
During a league match between Maribor and Koper, played on 8 March 2014, Zahović received a yellow card in the first minute of the second half stoppage time, due to excessive goal celebration. At the time of the booking, Zahović was at the players bench, however, even though the Slovene did not actually play during the match, the yellow card is nevertheless counted towards the official statistics of the Slovenian PrvaLiga.
During a league match between Koper and Maribor, played on 28 September 2013, Arghus received a yellow card in the fifth minute of the second half stoppage time, due to protests. At the time of the booking, Arghus was at the players bench, however, even though the Brazilian did not actually play during the match, the yellow card is nevertheless counted towards the official statistics of the Slovenian PrvaLiga.

See also
List of NK Maribor seasons

References

NK Maribor seasons
Maribor
Maribor
Maribor